Kathryn Karipides is a choreographer, modern dancer, and professor who developed and later co-directed Case Western Reserve University's dance program. Karipides is renowned for her choreography, particularly for the body of work created in her 10 years as choreographer and principal dancer for the Dance Theatre of Kathryn Karipides and Henry Kurth. She is a proponent for modern dance and a strong believer in expression of "anatomical truths" through choreography and movement.

Early life 
Kathryn Karipides was born in Canton, Ohio on February 29, 1934. Growing up in Canton, Karipedes had little formal dance training, participating primarily in an intense and physical Greek dancing style prevalent in her native community. It wasn't until she attended college at Miami University (Ohio) that Karipides began her formal dance education. In 1956, Karipides graduated from Miami University with a B.S. Degree in Physical Education. Upon graduation, Karipides began her career at the Flora Stone Mather College for Women, part of Western Reserve University. In this role, Karipides grew the dance program at Western Reserve University, now Case Western Reserve University, from a physical education class to a nationally recognized program within its Theatre Department.

Case Western Reserve University 
First hired within the Flora Stone Mather College, Karipides initially started her career as a temporary professor in the women's physical education department. Karipides was promoted to an associate professor with tenure in 1963. In 1972, the dance program Karipides started as a part of the physical education curriculum became a part of the theatre arts department. In 1975, Karipides became a co-director for the new Graduate Dance Program and in 1980, she became a full professor. Throughout her career, Kathryn Karipides served in a variety of administrative roles within the dance department including Acting Chair and Interim Deputy Provost. Kathryn Karipides retired from Case in 1998 as a Samuel B. and Virginia C. Knight Professor Emerita.

Intensive studies 
When Karipides started her career at Case Western Reserve University, she would spend her summers studying modern dance intensively outside of the institution. For three summers, Karipides studied at Connecticut College, known at the time as a mecca of dance. At Connecticut College, Karipides studied with notable modern dance artists including Martha Graham, Merce Cunningham, Lucas Hoving, José Limón, and Louis Horst.

Throughout her career, Karipides studied with many other modern dancers and at many studios around the world. Other dancers and studios include:
 Hanya Holm 
 Erick Hawkins
 Kelly Holt
 Hawkins Studio
 Mary Wigman Studio
 Dalcroze Institute
 Laban Art of Movement Studio

Cleveland Arts Prize 
The Cleveland Arts Prize aims to recognize exemplary artists in areas such as design, literature, theater & dance, music, and visual arts. In 1974, Kathryn Karipides received the Cleveland Arts Prize for Dance.  After winning the Prize for Dance, Karipides became closely involved with the organization, joining the board and chairing the Dance Prize Committee. Each year, the Cleveland Arts Prize reflects on past award members, selecting a "special honoree" from the past pool of candidates. In 2017, Karipides was once again recognized as a recipient of the Cleveland Arts Prize, this time as a special honoree.

Other awards and honors 
 Carl F. Wittke Award for outstanding undergraduate teaching (CWRU)
Samuel B. and Virginia C. Knight Professor of Humanities Honoree (CWRU)
 OhioDance Award
 Northern Ohio Live Award of Achievement for Dance
 YWCA Career Women of Achievement Award for the Cultural Arts
 Dionysian Award Recipient (Cleveland Chapter, American Hellenic Educational Progressive Association)

Notable premieres 
 Burning Water
 A Galaxy of Instants
 Lyre of Orpheus
 By Disposition of Angels 
 The Praise of Folly 
 With Antecedents-Mounds 
 Landscape with Creature
 Applause
 Anatoli
 Four by Four

References 

Living people
People from Canton, Ohio
1934 births
Miami University alumni
Case Western Reserve University faculty
Dance education in the United States
Dance teachers